The climate of Gibraltar is Mediterranean/Subtropical with mild winters and warm summers. Gibraltar has two main prevailing winds, an easterly one known as the Levante coming from the Sahara in Africa which brings humid weather and warmer sea currents and the other as Poniente which is westerly and brings fresher air and colder sea. Rain occurs mainly in winter; the summers are generally dry.

Average morning relative humidity: 82%, evening relative humidity: 64%. Sunshine hours are up to 2,778 per year, from 150 in November (~5 hours of sunshine per day) to 341 in July (~11 hours of sunshine per day).

Temperature 
The average number of days above  is 181, average number of days above  is 5-6 (2 in July, 3 in August).

Temperature of sea

See also
Climate of Spain

Notes

References 

Environment of Gibraltar
Geography of Gibraltar
Climate of Europe
Gibraltar
Gibraltar